Juan Alejandro Mahecha (born July 27, 1987) is a Colombian footballer who plays for La Equidad in Colombia. He plays as a defensive midfielder.

Mahecha was a starter on the 2007 Colombia national under-20 football team that failed to qualify for the 2007 World Cup.

References
 BDFA profile 
 

1987 births
Living people
Colombian footballers
Categoría Primera A players
Boyacá Chicó F.C. footballers
Club Atlético Belgrano footballers
Deportes Tolima footballers
Colombian expatriate footballers
Expatriate footballers in Argentina
Association football midfielders
People from Tunja
Sportspeople from Boyacá Department
21st-century Colombian people